Tijen Karaş (born 28 January 1975, Ankara) is a Turkish news anchor, working for state-run Turkish Radio and Television Corporation (TRT). In July 2016, during the attempted coup d'état, she was forced to read out a declaration of the coup plotter soldiers which had taken over the TRT building in Ankara.

Karaş is a graduate of Hacettepe University specializing in sociology. Previously, she worked on Turkey's TRT International Avrasya channel and edited the column "Sanat ve Politika" for the Turkish News Agency.

References

1975 births
Living people
People from Ankara
Turkish television news anchors
Turkish Radio and Television Corporation people
Hacettepe University alumni
Turkish women journalists
People involved in the 2016 Turkish coup d'état attempt
Women television journalists